Peter Frey (born 10 November 1949) is a Swiss sailor. He competed in the Tempest event at the 1972 Summer Olympics.

References

External links
 

1949 births
Living people
Swiss male sailors (sport)
Olympic sailors of Switzerland
Sailors at the 1972 Summer Olympics – Tempest
Place of birth missing (living people)